The Keweenaw Peninsula (sometimes locally ) is the northernmost part of Michigan's Upper Peninsula. It projects into Lake Superior and was the site of the first copper boom in the United States, leading to its moniker of "Copper Country." As of the 2000 census, its population was roughly 43,200. Its major industries are now logging and tourism, as well as jobs related to Michigan Technological University and Finlandia University.

Geology
The peninsula measures about 150 miles in length and about 50 miles in width at its base.

The ancient lava flows of the Keweenaw Peninsula were produced during the Mesoproterozoic Era as a part of the Midcontinent Rift between 1.096 and 1.087 billion years ago. This volcanic activity produced the only strata on Earth where large-scale economically recoverable 97 percent pure native copper is found.

Much of the native copper found in the Keweenaw comes in either the form of cavity fillings on lava flow surfaces, which has a ”lacy” consistency, or as "float" copper, which is found as a solid mass. Copper ore may occur within conglomerate or breccia as void or interclast fillings. The conglomerate layers occur as interbedded units within the volcanic pile.

The Keweenaw Peninsula and Isle Royale, formed by the Midcontinent Rift System, are the only sites in the United States with evidence of prehistoric aboriginal mining of copper. Artifacts made from this copper by these ancient indigenous people were traded as far south as present-day Alabama. These areas are also the unique location where chlorastrolite, the state gem of Michigan, can be found.

The northern end of the peninsula is sometimes referred to as Copper Island (or "Kuparisaari" by Finnish immigrants), although this term is becoming less common. It is separated from the rest of the peninsula by the Keweenaw Waterway, a natural waterway which was dredged and expanded in the 1860s across the peninsula between the cities of Houghton (named for Douglass Houghton) on the south side and Hancock on the north.

A Keweenaw Water Trail has been established around Copper Island.

The Keweenaw Fault runs fairly lengthwise through both Keweenaw and neighboring Houghton counties. This ancient geological slip has given rise to cliffs. U.S. Highway 41 (US 41) and Brockway Mountain Drive, north of Calumet, were constructed along the cliff line.

Climate
Lake Superior significantly controls the climate of the Keweenaw Peninsula, keeping winters milder than those in surrounding areas. Spring is cool and brief, transitioning into a summer with highs near . Fall begins in September, with winter beginning in mid-November.

The peninsula receives copious amounts of lake-effect snow from Lake Superior. Averages over  certainly occur in the higher elevations closer to the tip of the peninsula.

History

Beginning as early as seven thousand years ago and apparently peaking around 3000 B.C., Native Americans dug copper from the southern shore of Lake Superior. This development was possible in large part because, in this region, large deposits of copper were easily accessible in surface rock and from shallow diggings. Native copper could be found as large nuggets and wiry masses. Copper as a resource for functional tooling achieved popularity around 3000 B.C., during the Middle Archaic Stage. The focus of copper working seems to have gradually shifted from functional tools to ornamental objects by the Late Archaic Stage c. 1200 B.C. Native Americans would build a fire to heat the rock around and over a copper mass and, after heating, pour on cold water to crack the rock. The copper was then pounded out, using rock hammers and stone chisels.

The Keweenaw's rich deposits of copper (and some silver) were extracted on an industrial scale beginning around the middle of the 19th century. The industry grew through the latter part of the century and employed thousands of people well into the 20th century. Hard rock mining in the region ceased in 1967 though copper sulfide deposits continued for some time after in Ontonagon. This vigorous industry created a need for educated mining professionals and directly led in 1885 to the founding of the Michigan Mining School (now Michigan Technological University) in Houghton. Although MTU discontinued its undergraduate mining engineering program in 2006, the university continues to offer engineering degrees in a variety of other disciplines. (In 2012 mining engineering was restarted in the re-formed Department of Geological and Mining Engineering and Sciences.)

Running concurrently with the mining boom in the Keweenaw was the white pine lumber boom. Trees were cut for timbers for mine shafts, to heat the communities around the large copper mines, and to help build a growing nation. Much of the logging at the time was done in winter due to the ease of operability with the snow. Due to the logging practices at that time, the forest of the Keweenaw looks much different today from 100 years ago.

US 41 terminates in the northern Keweenaw at the Michigan State Park housing Fort Wilkins. US 41 was the so-called "Military Trail" that started in Chicago in the 1900s and ended in the Keweenaw wilderness. The restored fort has numerous exhibits.

For detailed information on the region's mineralogical history, see the virtual tour of the peninsula written by the Mineralogical Society of America, found in "External links" on this page. Information on the geological formations of the region are also detailed.

From 1964 to 1971, the University of Michigan and Michigan Technological University cooperated with NASA and the U.S. Navy to run the Keweenaw Rocket launch site.

Communities
A partial list of towns in the Keweenaw Peninsula:

Ahmeek
Albion
Allouez
Atlantic Mine
Baltic
Bete Grise
Blue Jacket
Boot Jack Point
Bumbletown
Calumet
Centennial
Centennial Heights
Central Mine
Chassell
Chickensville
Clifton
Copper Falls
Copper Harbor
Craig
Delaware
Dodgeville
Dollar Bay
Dreamland
Eagle Harbor
Eagle River
Florida location
Freda

Gay
Gratiot location
Gregoryville
Hancock
Hecla Location
Henwood
Houghton
Hubbell
Hurontown
Jacobsville
Kearsarge
Lac La Belle
Lake Linden
Lake Medora
Laurium
Linwood
Little Betsy
Mandan
Mason
Mellonsville
Mohawk
Misery Bay

Ojibway
Old Victoria
Osceola
Painesdale
Pelkie
Phillipsville
Phoenix
Pryor's Location
Quincy
Rabbit Bay
Raymbaultown Location
Red Jacket
Redridge
Ripley
Seeberville
Seneca location
Senter
South Kearsarge location
South Range
Swedetown
Tamarack
Tapiola
Tecumseh
Toivola
Trimountain
West Tamarack
White City
Wyoming location (Helltown)
Yellow Jacket

See also
Copper mining in Michigan
Keweenaw National Historical Park
Thimbleberry

References

Further reading

.
, focuses on three companies, Calumet & Hecla, Copper Range, and Quincy, in a study of native copper mining and copper-sulfide mining on Upper Michigan's Keweenaw Peninsula.
.

Primary sources
.

External links

Keweenaw Convention & Visitors Bureau
Keweenaw Peninsula Chamber of Commerce
Keweenaw Time Traveler
Copper Country Explorer

Copper mines in Michigan
Peninsulas of Michigan
Regions of Michigan
Upper Peninsula of Michigan
Landforms of Houghton County, Michigan
Landforms of Keweenaw County, Michigan
Geography of Houghton County, Michigan
Geography of Keweenaw County, Michigan
Volcanism of Michigan
Rift volcanism
Extinct volcanism